The 2017 Rugby League World Cup Americas qualification was a rugby league tournament that was held in December 2015 to decide the American qualifier for the 2017 Rugby League World Cup. It consisted of a round-robin tournament involving three teams, Canada, Jamaica and the United States, at two venues in Florida in the United States.

The United States won the tournament and qualified for the World Cup.

Overview 
On 3 October 2014, the 2017 Rugby League World Cup qualifying competition was announced. Seven of the eight teams who made the knockout-stages of the 2013 Rugby League World Cup were announced as automatic qualifiers.

USA, who were quarter-finalists in 2013, were denied automatic qualification due to an internal governance dispute which saw the nation's Rugby League International Federation membership temporarily suspended. Once the issue was resolved, USA was allowed to enter the qualification process. In August 2015, the qualifiers were announced to be held in Florida in December 2015.

Squads

Canada
The Canada squad as of 26 November 2015 was as follows:

Coach:  Aaron Zimmerle

Jamaica
The Jamaica squad as of 25 November 2015 was as follows:

Coach:  Romeo Monteith

United States
The USA squad as of 25 November 2015 was as follows:

On 2 December the US team suffered a setback after Tui Samoa pulled out of the squad for personal reasons. He was replaced by Corey Makelim.

Coach:  Brian McDermott

Standings

Fixtures

United States vs Jamaica

Canada vs Jamaica

United States vs Canada
This match was also the third and final game of the 2015 Colonial Cup series.

References 

2015 in rugby league
2017 Rugby League World Cup
2015 in American sports
2015 in Canadian sports
2015 in Jamaican sport